Kevin Houston may refer to:
 Kevin Houston (basketball)
 Kevin Houston (mathematician)